WUMF is the student run radio station of the University of Maine Farmington, located in Farmington, Maine broadcasting on 91.5 FM. The station reports music played to College Music Journal however popular music can be heard, as well as talk and sports programming.

History
The first WUMF license was obtained in 1972. WUMF-FM initially broadcast on 91.9 MHz, but as a grandfathered Class D station, it was limited in its broadcast power and could be bumped around the dial to allow other facilities to be improved. It moved to 92.3 in 1981, 100.5 in 1985 and 100.1 in 2002, each time being moved to allow upgrades for other stations (such as WMME-FM).

The University of Maine System applied for a new Class A license on 91.5 MHz in late 2007. In September 2010, the WUMF call letters moved from the 100.1 license to the new 91.5 facility, which came on air for the first time. On the new license, WUMF began broadcasting with 100 watts as opposed to the previous 13. (The 100.1 frequency was designated WUMK before being turned in to the FCC.)

Programs

WUMF's goal is to bring new, unheard music to the students of the University of Maine at Farmington, and is constantly updating its rotation. It has a strong indie, alternative, and alt-punk sound, although it carries a wide variety of genres for the listening masses. WUMF has between 60-100 DJs, pending the semester, and at least 12 executive board positions consisting of Station Manager, Program Director, a variety of Music Directors, etc. It has a reputation for pushing the limits and making students think.

References

External links 

FCC History Cards for WUMF, FCC Facility ID 69365

UMF
UMF
University of Maine at Farmington
Farmington, Maine
Radio stations established in 1972